The California Bureau of Real Estate Appraisers (BREA) is a division of the California Department of Consumer Affairs responsible for real estate appraiser licensing and certification in California.

Activities
The California Real Estate Act has two core components: licensing and enforcement. Both licensing and enforcement functions are required by the Appraisal Subcommittee (ASC), the federal government organization which oversees all state real estate appraiser licensing agencies.

Enforcement
The enforcement unit, operates under a federal mandate, and ensures adherence to the federally required Uniform Standards of Professional Appraisal Practice (USPAP), California law and regulations.

Licensing
In order to be issued an appraisal license, BREA requires applicants to meet all the criteria established by the Appraisal Qualifications Board (AQB) of the Appraisal Foundation.

Regulations require the application for a real estate appraiser license to include their social security number. Pursuant to SB 237, the licensing Unit also performs background checks on appraisal management companies in order to register them as required.

Accreditation
BREA is responsible for the accreditation of educational courses and providers for real estate appraisers and has reviewed and approved over 1,800 pre-licensing and continuing education courses. In addition to the real estate appraisal related courses offered by the community college, University of California, and California State University systems, over 90 proprietary schools provide appraiser education.

Laws and regulations
In response to Title XI of the Financial Institutions Reform, Recovery, and Enforcement Act of 1989 (FIRREA), the California Legislature enacted the Real Estate Appraisers Licensing and Certification Law in 1990 as an amendment to the Real Estate Law. State regulations are codified at Chapter 6.5, Title 10 of the California Code of Regulations (10 CCR §§ 3500 et seq.), and federal regulations are included in Regulation Y and Regulation Z.

A new Regulation Z of the Truth in Lending Act was adopted in 2008 to help prevent the improper influence of appraisers and to reduce the chances that appraisers would be pressured to "hit" certain target property values or return pre-determined, unsupported valuations when appraising real property.

See also
 California Bureau of Real Estate

Notes

External links
 
 Real Estate Appraisers in the California Code of Regulations

Real Estate Appraisers, Bureau of
Real estate in the United States
Subprime mortgage crisis